The Ranch is a 2004 American made-for-television comedy-drama film directed by Susan Seidelman starring Jennifer Aspen, Jessica Collins, Samantha Ferris and Nicki Micheaux.

Plot
The film takes place at a professional bordello in Nevada, where prostitution is somewhat legal, the sex workers employed there and the clients that frequent it.

Cast

 Jennifer Aspen as Shayna
 Jessica Collins as Kim
 Samantha Ferris as Taylor
 Nicki Micheaux as Velvet
 Paige Moss as Rickie Lee
 Ty Olsson as Other David
 Bonnie Root as Emily
 Carly Pope as Beth Ann
 Amy Madigan as Mary Larkin
 Giacomo Baessato as Ray
 Lucia Walters as Lavender Rose
 Cailin Stadmyk as Chicklet
 Dana McLoughlin as Janey
 Veronika Habal as Cat
 Paula Shaw as Yetta

References

2004 television films
2004 films
2004 comedy-drama films
American comedy-drama television films
Films directed by Susan Seidelman
Films set in Nevada
Spyglass Entertainment films
Showtime (TV network) films
2000s American films
2000s English-language films